Joseph M. McCormick (1877–1925) was a U.S. Senator from Illinois from 1919 to 1925.

Senator McCormick may also refer to:

Dale McCormick (born 1947), Maine State Senate
Earle McCormick, Maine State Senate
George M. McCormick (1841–1913), Illinois State Senate
James Robinson McCormick (1824–1897), Missouri State Senate
John McCormick (British politician) (1887/1888–1958), Northern Irish Senate

See also
Senator McCormack (disambiguation)